The 1969 Pacific Southwest Open – Men's doubles was an event of the 1969 Pacific Southwest Open tennis tournament and was played on outdoor hard courts at the Los Angeles Tennis Center in Los Angeles, California in the United States between September 22 and September 28, 1969. Ken Rosewall and Fred Stolle were the defending Pacific Southwest Open doubles champions but did not compete together in this edition. Unseeded Pancho Gonzales and Ron Holmberg won the title by defeating unseeded Jim McManus and Jim Osborne in the final, 6–3, 6–4.

Seeds

Draw

Finals

Top half

Bottom half

References

External links
 ITF tournament edition details

Los Angeles Open (tennis)
Pacific Southwest Open
Pacific Southwest Open